Bridgeland High School is a high school in the Bridgeland community in unincorporated Harris County, Texas, in the Houston metropolitan area. It is part of the Cypress-Fairbanks Independent School District (CFISD).

History
Michael Smith is the first principal of Bridgeland High School. Before Bridgeland opened, he was the principal of Cy-Fair High School.

The opening relieved Cypress Ranch High School.

Campus
Bridgeland High School is located near Texas State Highway 99 (Grand Parkway), off of Mason Road. It has a four-story academic wing, which is the first of its kind in the district.

Bridgeland will be a part of an "Educational Village", a multi-campus site that will include Wells Elementary and a middle school. The high school will be the tallest structure in the complex.

Academics
For the 2018–2019 school year, the school received an A grade from the Texas Education Agency, with an overall score of 95 out of 100. The school received an A grade in two domains, Student Achievement (score of 94) and Closing the Gaps (score of 96), and a B grade for School Progress (score of 83). The school received four of the seven possible distinction designations for Academic Achievement in English Language Arts/Reading, Academic Achievement in Social Studies, Post-Secondary Readiness, and Top 25%: Comparative Closing the Gaps.

Demographics
The demographic breakdown of the 3.543 students enrolled for 2020–21 was:
African American: 11.4%
Hispanic: 21.1%
White: 52.8%
Native American: 0.5%
Asian: 9.1%
Pacific Islander: 0.2%
Two or More Races: 3.9%

14.7% of the students were eligible for free or reduced-cost lunch.

Feeder patterns
Schools that feed into Bridgeland include:
Elementary schools: Ault, Keith, Pope, Swenke, Wells 
Middle schools: Salyards, Smith (partial)

Notable alumni
Conner Weigman (2022) – college football player for the Texas A&M Aggies

References

External links
 

Cypress-Fairbanks Independent School District high schools
Educational institutions established in 2017
2017 establishments in Texas
Public high schools in Texas